NGC 630 is an elliptical galaxy in the constellation Sculptor. It is estimated to be 275 million light years from the Milky Way and has a diameter of approximately 125,000 light years. The object was discovered on October 23, 1835 by the English astronomer John Herschel.

References 

630
Elliptical galaxies
Sculptor (constellation)